The  is a denomination of the Japanese yen. The current design was first minted in 1959 using Japanese characters known as the "new script", and were also minted from 1948 to 1958 using "old-script" Japanese characters. Five-yen coins date to 1870 (when, due to the much higher value of the yen, they were minted in gold). The modern-day coin was first produced in 1948 with a differently styled inscription. This was changed in 1959 and the design has remained unchanged since.

The obverse of the coin depicts a rice plant growing out of the water, with "five yen" written in kanji; the reverse is stamped with "Japan" and the year of issue, also in kanji, separated by sprouts of a tree. The three graphic elements of the coin represent agriculture and fisheries, the key elements of the Japanese first-sector economy. Around the central hole, there is a gear that represents industry. It is the only Japanese coin in circulation to lack Arabic numerals on either side.

History

Gold five yen (1870-1930)
Five yen coins were first struck in gold for the Japanese government in 1870 at the San Francisco Mint. During this time a new mint was being established at Osaka, which did not receive the gold bullion needed for coinage until the following year. The yen as a unit of currency was officially adopted by the Meiji government in an act signed on June 27, 1871. For this particular denomination, its not known if any five yen coins dated 1871 (year 4) were actually struck that year as official records have coinage beginning in 1872. The first and second five yen coin designs feature a dragon figure on the obverse surrounded by legends, while the reverse features the emblem of the Imperial family. Each coin was initially struck in .900 fine gold with a weight of 8.3g, and a diameter of 23.8mm. The diameter was later reduced to 21.8mm when the second design was introduced in 1872. Five yen coins continued to be struck uninterrupted until 1879, when for an unknown reason none were recorded as minted. Coinage resumed in 1880 and remained unchanged until 1897 when Japan officially switched from a silver standard to a gold standard. During this time the gold five yen coin was given a third and final new design. The diameter was reduced from 21.8mm down to 16.9mm, and the weight was changed from 8.3 to 4.2 grams. Redemption of old silver coins for new gold coins at par began on October 1, 1897 and lasted until closure on July 31, 1898. 

During the Taishō era the production of five yen coins was impacted by World War I as a gold embargo was imposed in 1917 by the United States. Even though this embargo was later lifted in June 1919, the Japanese government continued it by importing gold heavily to re-enforce the gold reserve of the Bank of Japan. Government officials at the time had the opinion that no inflation could take place so long as the percentage of gold cover had not been lowered. This embargo was not absolute however, as it was recorded that some gold coins were paid out between 1920 and 1928 in very small amounts. The gold embargo was later lifted in January 1930, only for it to be re-imposed on December 31, 1931. Five yen coins were last minted in gold during this brief time to act as a reserve for gold certificates. None of these coins were in general use afterwards as the medium of commerce consisted of nonconvertible 5 yen banknotes.

Modern five yen (1948-)

Almost 20 years would pass before the Japanese government authorized the production of a new five yen coin. These new coins were first struck in 1948 and are made of a brass alloy consisting of 60 to 70% copper, and 30 to 40% zinc. Using this type of alloy combination is now a remnant from when World War II era weapons were scrapped to produce the coins. These coins feature a pigeon within a circle on one side and the National Diet on the other and were only minted for two years. Two different varieties were made in 1949 which included the old pigeon type coins, and new coins featuring a hole in the center. These first holed five yen coins use an old style Japanese script known as Kaisho. The Japanese government added the hole in the center of the coin to save material costs. The overall design of the coin featuring rice, water and a gear on the obverse, and tree sprouts on the reverse has not changed since this time. The final design which is minted today uses a modern style script which was first added in 1959.

Five yen coins made headlines in 1999 in regards to the nuclear accident at Tokai, Ibaraki. Physicists Masuchika Kohno and Yoshinobu Koizumi showed how the coin could be used to estimate neutron dosage to the surrounding population, by measuring its zinc isotope ratios. They concluded that the coin could offer information about the total neutron effect during the accident. The coins could also give insight about shielding modern Japanese houses as the coins were recovered from indoors.

Very few five yen coins were minted between 2009 and 2013 making them premium coins for collectors as coins for the latter four years are confined to mint sets. This was due to an increase in the usage of electronic currency which inhibited demand for new coins. Mintage figures recovered in 2014 as general production resumed until 2022, when 5 yen coins were again confined to mint sets.

Cultural significance 
The Japanese for "five yen," go en (五円) is a homophone with go-en (御縁), "en" being a word for causal connection or relationship, and "go" being a respectful prefix. As a result, five-yen coins are commonly given as donations at Shinto shrines with the intention of establishing a good connection with the deity of the shrine. Several different interpretations of this "luck" exist depending on how many five yen coins are offered. While it is generally said that offering "lucky" 5 yen coins as tribute is good, there are others who disagree. Those who hold this position state that "perforated coins" such as "5 yen" and "50 yen" are unlucky due to their central holes. Shrines in general depend on offerings in either case to fund maintenance, repairs, and operations for the deity or deities enshrined. There are also other forms of offerings welcomed at shrines depending on the place and customs allowed. According to a priest at Chichibu Shrine, harvested rice was historically given as Shinto deities do not like cash itself as tribute. Five yen coins are also sometimes given as gifts of "good fortune" during the Japanese New Year. These gifts are traditionally given to children in decorated envelopes called , with the total amount of money included depending on age.

Composition

Circulation figures

Meiji

The following are circulation figures for the coins that were minted between the 3rd, and the 45th and last year of Meiji's reign. Coins for this period all begin with the Japanese symbol 明治 (Meiji). One yen trade dollars and/or patterns are not included here.

Inscriptions on Japanese coins from this period are read clockwise from right to left: 
"Year" ← "Number representing year of reign" ← "Emperor's name" (Ex: 年 ← 五十三 ← 治明)

Taishō
The following are circulation figures for the coins that were minted during the 2nd and 13th year of Taishō's reign. Coins from this period all begin with the Japanese symbol 大正 (Taishō).

Inscriptions on Japanese coins from this period are read clockwise from right to left: 
"Year" ← "Number representing year of reign" ← "Emperor's name" (Ex: 年 ← 三十 ← 正大)

Shōwa

The following are circulation dates which cover Emperor Hirohito's reign. The dates below correspond with the 23rd to the 64th year (last) of his reign. All five yen coins that were made before 1959 use kyūjitai, or old script Japanese. In 1949 only, two different styles of writing were used before a more modern one was established in 1950. This second style of writing was used until 1958 when the current script of Japanese took its place in the following year. Coins for this period will all begin with the Japanese symbol 昭和 (Shōwa).

Japanese coins are read with a left to right format: 
"Emperor's name" → "Number representing year of reign" → "Year" (Ex: 昭和 → 四十八 → 年).

Heisei

The following are circulation dates during the reign of Emperor Akihito (Heisei), who reigned from 1989 until his abdication in April 2019. The first year of his reign is marked with a 元 symbol on the coin as a one-year type. Coins for this period all begin with the kanji characters 平成 (Heisei). Five-yen coins dated between 2010 and 2013 were only released in mint sets.

Japanese coins are read with a left to right format: 
"Emperors name" → "Number representing year of reign" → "Year" (Ex: 平成 → 二十六 → 年).

Reiwa
The following are circulation dates in the reign of the current Emperor. Naruhito's accession to the Crysanthemum Throne took place on May 1, 2019 and he was formally enthroned on October 22, 2019. Coins for this period all begin with the Japanese symbol 令和 (Reiwa). The inaugural year coin (2019) was marked 元 (first) and debuted during the summer of that year.

Japanese coins are read with a left to right format: 
"Emperors name" → "Number representing year of reign" → "Year" (Ex: 令和 → 二 → 年).

Notes

References

External links 

 Circulating coin list -Japan Mint.
 Five yen coins from 1948 to 1958 - Bank of Japan 

Japanese yen coins
Five-base-unit coins